Arendal Fotball is a Norwegian professional football club based in Arendal. The club competes in the 2. divisjon, the third tier of football in Norway.

History
It was established on 27 September 2010, and started contesting in the 2011 3. divisjon which is the fourth tier of the Norwegian league system. In its second season, in 2012, the team won promotion to third tier. From 2013 to 2016 the team played in the third tier of the Norwegian league system, and won promotion to the second tier in 2016.

The club is an umbrella team for IK Grane and IF Trauma. The two clubs had tried fielding an umbrella team earlier from 2000 to 2008, called FK Arendal. FK Arendal never reached the same level as Arendal Fotball.

Men's team
{|class="wikitable"
|-bgcolor="#efefef"
! Season
! 
! Pos.
! Pl.
! W
! D
! L
! GS
! GA
! P
!Cup
!Notes
|-
|2011
|3. divisjon
|align=right|3
|align=right|24||align=right|15||align=right|2||align=right|7
|align=right|82||align=right|41||align=right|47
|1st round
|
|-
|2012
|3. divisjon
|align=right bgcolor=#DDFFDD| 1
|align=right|26||align=right|24||align=right|1||align=right|1
|align=right|129||align=right|22||align=right|73
|2nd round
|Promoted to 2. divisjon
|-
|2013
|2. divisjon
|align=right|5
|align=right|26||align=right|11||align=right|4||align=right|11
|align=right|36||align=right|42||align=right|37
|1st round
|
|-
|2014
|2. divisjon
|align=right|8
|align=right|26||align=right|10||align=right|4||align=right|12
|align=right|47||align=right|58||align=right|34
|2nd round
|
|-
|2015
|2. divisjon
|align=right |7
|align=right|26||align=right|9||align=right|7||align=right|10
|align=right|46||align=right|51||align=right|34
|3rd round
|
|-
|2016 
|2. divisjon
|align=right bgcolor=#DDFFDD| 1
|align=right|26||align=right|19||align=right|6||align=right|1
|align=right|75||align=right|24||align=right|63
|1st round
|Promoted to 1. divisjon
|-
|2017
|1. divisjon
|align=right bgcolor="#FFCCCC"| 16
|align=right|30||align=right|5||align=right|6||align=right|19
|align=right|33||align=right|62||align=right|21
|2nd round
|Relegated to 2. divisjon
|-
|2018 
|2. divisjon
|align=right|6
|align=right|26||align=right|10||align=right|6||align=right|10
|align=right|37||align=right|34||align=right|36
|2nd round
|
|-
|2019
|2. divisjon
|align=right|6
|align=right|26||align=right|12||align=right|3||align=right|11
|align=right|49||align=right|40||align=right|39
|2nd round
|
|-
|2020
|2. divisjon
|align=right|5
|align=right|19||align=right|9||align=right|5||align=right|5
|align=right|32||align=right|18||align=right|32
|Cancelled
|
|-
|2021
|2. divisjon
|align=right|2
|align=right|26||align=right|13||align=right|9||align=right|4
|align=right|57||align=right|38||align=right|48
|3rd round
|
|-
|2022
|2. divisjon
|align=right|2
|align=right|24||align=right|18||align=right|2||align=right|4
|align=right|55||align=right|35||align=right|56
|2nd round
|
|}
Source:

Players

Current squad

References

External links
 

 
Arendal
2010 establishments in Norway
Association football clubs established in 2010
Football clubs in Norway
Sport in Aust-Agder